Rasol is a village/Panchayat in Dhenkanal district, Odisha, India. It is a focal point for nearby villages due to its important commercial market area. Rasol is surrounded by villages such as Kalingapal, Naukiari, Bahalunda, and Bankatia. The National Highway 655 (India) passes through Rasol.

History 

Rasol is an ancient village with a known history dating back 300 years. It was part of the Hindol State, which was one of the princely states of India during the period of the British Raj. Rasol was led by the Samanta Raja, who was appointed by the King of Hindol.

Demography 
The area falls under Rasol Panchayat of Hindol block. The population in 2019/2020 was between 7,370 and 9,118, and the total number of households was 1910.

Roads well connect Rasol with frequent bus services to Bhubaneswar, Cuttack, Dhenkanal, Anugul, Rourkela, and other district and state parts. The old Cuttack-Sambalpur road which is National Highway 655 (India) passes through Rasol.

Rasol has a sub-post office, police station, and primary dispensary. People from nearby villages are dependent on Rasol for services such as banking, health care, and marketing.

It is proposed to be a NAC (Nagar panchayat).

Places of interest

Sapua Dam is 5 km away from Rasol. Tourists throughout the state travel to enjoy its scenery and views all year round.

The best time to visit is between September and March.

The famous Ugreswar Mahadev Temple, Chitalpur is also just 4 km away.

Schools 

 Rasol High School
 Saraswati Shishu Mandir
 St. Xavier High School
 Rasol M. E school
Kalingapal Govt. High School

Festivals 

There are multiple festivals observed in Rasol and the surrounding villages. The largest celebrations are during Dolajatra/Holi, Laxmi Puja, Jhamu Jatra, Janmashtami, and Ratha jatra.

Laxmi Puja and Jhamujatra are of particular importance, and hence have large celebrations every year.

References 

Villages in Dhenkanal district